Paio is a variety of Iberian embutido sausage. Paio may also refer to:

São Paio (disambiguation), various places in Portugal
Paio Peres Correia (born c. 1205), a medieval Portuguese Christian conqueror of the Reconquista
Paio Pires de Guimarães (born 1100), a medieval Knight and Rico-homem of the County of Portugal

See also
Paia (disambiguation)